Robert Martin Bone is an important scholar in the study of Canada's Geography.

Robert Martin Bone got his first degree in Geography from the University of British Columbia and was able to get his masters at the  University of Washington in 1957 and the University of Nebraska in 1962. He worked with the Canadian government for a number of years before being selected as a professor at the Institute of Northern Studies (INS).

With around 20 publications, Bone is also the author of The Regional Geography of Canada, a textbook used in Canadian universities.

Bibliography 
Notes

References 
 - Total pages: 510 

1933 births
University of Nebraska alumni
University of Washington alumni
University of British Columbia alumni
Academic staff of the University of Saskatchewan
University of Saskatchewan
Living people